Jack Tinkler is a former football (soccer) player who represented New Zealand at the international level.

Tinkler played two official A-international matches for the All Whites in 1927, both against the touring Canadians, the first a 2–2 draw on 25 June 1927, the second a 1–2 loss on 2 July.

References 

Year of birth missing (living people)
Possibly living people
Manurewa AFC players
New Zealand association footballers
New Zealand international footballers
Association footballers not categorized by position